Northern Peru could refer to 
Republic of North Peru, one of the three republics within the short-lived Peru–Bolivian Confederation of the 19th century
Republic of North Peru (1838–1839), another short-lived state that seceded from the Peru–Bolivian Confederation in 1838
Loreto Region, Peru's present-day northernmost region, covering almost one-third of the country's territory
Amazonas Region, located just west of Loreto Region
Piura Region, a much larger coastal region, immediately south of Tumbes
Cajamarca Region, between the regions of Amazonas and Piura

See also
Regions of Peru